Robert E. Antonacci is an American politician and judge from Syracuse, New York. A Republican, Antonacci served as Onondaga County Comptroller from 2008 to 2018. He was the Republican nominee for New York State Comptroller in 2014, losing to incumbent Democrat Tom DiNapoli. He was elected to the New York State Senate in New York's 50th State Senate district in 2018. In 2019, Antonacci was elected as a Justice of the New York Supreme Court—a trial-level court—in the Fifth Judicial District and stepped down from his Senate seat.

Early life and education
Antonacci was born and raised in Syracuse, New York, and graduated from Le Moyne College. Following graduation, he worked with Ernst & Young as a Certified Public Accountant. He is married with two children.

Following his time as a CPA, Antonacci attended Syracuse University School of Law, graduating cum laude, and later entered into a private law practice.

Career

Onondaga County Comptroller
In 2003, Antonacci ran for comptroller of Onondaga County as a Democrat, but lost to incumbent Republican Donald F. Colon. However, in 2007, Antonacci was elected to the post as a Republican. After taking office in 2008, he won reelection in 2011 and again in 2015. Antonacci resigned his post after being elected to the New York State Senate in 2018.

Campaigns for New York State Comptroller

Antonacci unsuccessfully sought the Republican nomination for New York State Comptroller in 2010. Four years later, after no other candidates came forward, he accepted the Republican nomination for the 2014 New York Comptroller election, anticipating that he would receive matching funds for his campaign. He failed to raise enough money to qualify for matching funds under the state's pilot program and lost to incumbent Thomas DiNapoli.

New York State Senate
In 2018, longtime Republican Senator John DeFrancisco announced that he would not seek re-election in Senate District 50. DeFrancisco's decision left the District 50 seat open for the first time since 1992. Soon after, Antonnaci declared his candidacy for the seat. Democrats targeted the district as a prime pickup opportunity, lining up behind the candidacy of public school teacher John Mannion. Although Democrats won control of the New York State Senate in 2018, Antonacci won his election; he defeated Mannion by a margin of 51% to 49%. He was sworn in on December 29, 2018.

Antonacci stepped down from his State Senate seat on December 31, 2019 after being elected to the New York State Supreme Court.

Justice of the New York State Supreme Court

One year into his State Senate term, Antonacci accepted nominations to run for a seat on the New York State Supreme Court, Fifth Judicial District. Antonacci sought the judgeship vacated upon the June 2019 death of James Tormey III, one of Antonacci's prominent mentors. In November 2019, Antonacci was elected to the New York State Supreme Court. He participated in a swearing-in ceremony on December 30, 2019.

References

External links

Living people
Politicians from Syracuse, New York
Le Moyne College alumni
Syracuse University College of Law alumni
21st-century American politicians
Republican Party New York (state) state senators
County auditors in the United States
Year of birth missing (living people)